Gaspard Bauhin or Caspar Bauhin (17 January 1560 – 5 December 1624), was a Swiss botanist whose Pinax theatri botanici (1623) described thousands of plants and classified them in a manner that draws comparisons to the later binomial nomenclature of Linnaeus. He was a disciple of the famous Italian physician Girolamo Mercuriale and he also worked on human anatomical nomenclature.

Linnaeus honored the Bauhin brothers Gaspard and Jean in the genus name Bauhinia.

Biography 

Jean and Gaspard were the sons of Jean Bauhin (1511–1582), a French physician who had to leave his native country on becoming a convert to Protestantism. Gaspard was born in Basel. From 1572 he studied in his hometown, Padua, Bologna, Montpellier, Paris and Tübingen. He was awarded his medical doctorate at the University of Basel in 1581, and gave private lectures in botany and anatomy. In 1581 he obtained a doctorate in medicine from the University of Basel and was in 1582 appointed to the Greek professorship at the same university, as well as in 1588 to the chair of anatomy and botany. He was later made city physician, professor of the practice of medicine, rector of the university, and dean of his faculty. He was rector of the university of Basel in 1592, then again in 1611 and 1619; during the second rectorate the university tried in vain to win back from the city council the freedoms of 1460, which were lost in 1532.

The Pinax theatri botanici (English, Illustrated exposition of plants) is a landmark of botanical history, describing some 6,000 species and classifying them. The classification system was not particularly innovative, using traditional groups such as "trees", "shrubs", and "herbs", and using other characteristics such as utilization, for instance grouping spices into the Aromata. He did correctly group grasses, legumes, and several others. His most important contribution is in the description of genera and species. He introduced many names of genera that were later adopted by Linnaeus, and remain in use. For species he carefully pruned the descriptions down to as few words as possible; in many cases a single word sufficed as description, thus giving the appearance of a two-part name. However, the single-word description was still a description intended to be diagnostic, not an arbitrarily-chosen name (in the Linnaean system, many species names honor individuals, for instance).

In addition to Pinax Theatri Botanici, Gaspard planned another work, a Theatrum Botanicum, meant to be comprised in twelve parts folio, of which he finished three; only one, however, was published (1658), long after his death. He also gave a copious catalogue of the plants growing in the environs of Basel, its flora, and edited the works of Pietro Andrea Mattioli (1500–1577) with considerable additions. His principal work on anatomy was Theatrum Anatomicum infinitis locis auctum (1592).

Works 

 (as editor), Petri Andreae Matthioli Opera Omnia, Johannes König, Basel, 1574.
 Theatrum anatomicum infinitis locis auctum, ad morbos accommodatum, Basel, 1592.
 Theatrum Anatomicum, Frankfurt am Main, 1605.
 
 Anatomica corporis virilis et muliebris historia, Leiden, 1597.
 
  The introduction to his projected magnum opus.
 
 Pinax theatri botanici, Basel, 1623.
 
 
 Theatrum Botanicum, 1658.
 Histoire des plantes de l’Europe, et des plus usitées qui viennent d’Asie, d’Afrique, & de l’Amérique […], 2 voll., Lyon, 1671.

See also 
 Herman Boerhaave
 Joseph Pitton de Tournefort
 Ileocecal valve

References

External links 
 University of Kyoto Online Pinax theatri botanici (1623)
 Online Galleries, History of Science Collections, University of Oklahoma Libraries High resolution images of works by and/or portraits of Gaspard Bauhin in .jpg and .tiff format.
 Images from Theatrum anatomicum From The College of Physicians of Philadelphia Digital Library
 Caspari (Gaspard) Bauhini, Prodromos Theatri Botanici (1620) Digitized Copy on Archive.org

1560 births
1624 deaths
Scientists from Basel-Stadt
17th-century Swiss botanists
Swiss mycologists
16th-century Swiss physicians
Academic staff of the University of Basel
Members of the Lincean Academy
16th-century Swiss botanists